KDFT (540 kHz) is a commercial AM radio station licensed to Ferris, Texas and broadcasting to the Dallas-Fort Worth Metroplex.  It is owned and operated by Multicultural Broadcasting and airs a Spanish-language Christian talk and teaching radio format.  It's slogan is "La Ponderosa" or "The Power."

By day, KDFT is powered at 1,000 watts.  But 540 AM is a Mexican and Canadian clear channel frequency.  So to avoid interference, KDFT reduces its nighttime power to 249 watts.  It uses a directional antenna at all times.  The transmitter is off Wickliffe Road in Bristol, Texas.

History

Gospel years
The station began its broadcasting activities under Freedom Network's direction in 1986 with a Southern Gospel format with temporary call sign KLCA before making a permanent switch to KDFT two months later.

Then in 1990, the station was sold to Way Broadcasting, and changed its format to urban gospel, focusing on Dallas-Fort Worth's African American community. From that day on, it was known as "The Rainbow Across North Texas" (the station's slogan).

Change to Spanish
In 1998, KDFT again changed its format to Spanish Christian radio format under the same name and slogan until 1999. In 2000, Radio Unica purchased KDFT from Way Broadcasting. Then in 2004, its current owners Multicultural Broadcasting absorbed KDFT and the remainder of Radio Unica's stations after that company filed for bankruptcy a year prior.

Throughout the station's existence, it has operated as a daytimer, required to sign off at night.  But in 2004, it received Federal Communications Commission permission to expand its airtime to 24 hours a day.

References

External links

 DFW Radio/TV History

DFT
DFT
DFT
Radio stations established in 1986
1986 establishments in Texas
Multicultural Broadcasting stations